In linguistics and theoretical computer science, literal movement grammars (LMGs) are a grammar formalism intended to characterize certain extraposition phenomena of natural language such as topicalization and cross-serial dependency. LMGs extend the class of context free grammars (CFGs) by adding introducing pattern-matched function-like rewrite semantics, as well as the operations of variable binding and slash deletion. LMGs were introduced by A.V. Groenink in 1995.

Description

The basic rewrite operation of an LMG is very similar to that of a CFG, with the addition of arguments to the non-terminal symbols. The arguments  are strings of terminal symbols and/or variable symbols defining an argument pattern. In the case where an argument pattern has multiple adjacent variable symbols, the argument pattern will match any and all partitions of the actual value that unify. In this way, a single rule is actually a family of alternatives.

An "item" in a literal movement grammar is one of

 , a predicate of arity n,

An item , where x is something that produces a terminal string (either a terminal string itself or some predicate), and y is a string of terminals and/or variables, is rewritten as the empty string if and only if , and otherwise cannot be rewritten at all.

Example

LMGs can characterize the non-CF language  as follows:

Computational power

Languages generated by LMGs contain the context-free languages as a proper subset, as every CFG is an LMG where all predicates have arity 0 and no production rule contains variable bindings or slash deletions.

References

Formal languages
Grammar frameworks